The 2021–22 ISU Junior Grand Prix was the 24th season of a series of junior international competitions organized by the International Skating Union. It was the junior-level complement to the 2021–22 ISU Grand Prix of Figure Skating. Skaters competed for medals in the disciplines of men's singles, women's singles, pairs, and ice dance, as well as for qualifying points. The top six from each discipline qualified for the 2021–22 Junior Grand Prix Final, to be held together with the senior final and later cancelled due to the COVID-19 pandemic.

Impact of the COVID-19 pandemic 
On June 23, 2021, Skate Canada cancelled the second event of the series that it had been scheduled to host in Edmonton, Alberta, citing concerns surrounding the COVID-19 pandemic. The Fédération Française des Sports de Glace, the host of the series' first event in Courchevel, offered to replace Skate Canada as host by holding a second, separate JGP event in Courchevel on the originally scheduled dates. Due to the size of the rink in Courchevel, the pairs event originally scheduled for JGP Canada was reallotted to JGP Poland.

On June 23, the Japan Skating Federation announced that, due to pandemic-related travel restrictions, it would not be sending athletes to any of the first three JGP events. JSF ultimately chose to forego the JGP series entirely and did not send athletes to any of the events. In addition to the JSF, the Chinese Skating Association also did not send athletes to any of the events due to the mandatory quarantine period upon returning home.

On August 5, the ISU announced that due to varying travel and quarantine restrictions during the pandemic, it would consider re-allocation requests on a case-by-case basis according to an outlined criteria of preference. The ISU also said that they would abandon the re-allocation process in the event of an abundance of requests or overly complex requests that would cause logistical issues. In addition, the ISU decided not to implement a JGP ranking for the season and to instead prioritize holding the JGP series safely "with the best possible participation" in light of the pandemic. The ISU will evaluate if and how skaters could qualify for the 2021–22 Junior Grand Prix Final, scheduled for December in Osaka, under alternative qualification criteria.

On August 10, the Figure Skating Federation of Russia (FFKKR) announced that due to quarantine and vaccination requirements for Russian citizens entering France, it would not be able to send skaters to either of the first two stages in Courchevel. As a result, the FFKKR asked the ISU to redistribute the quotas of Russian figure skaters from both stages in France to other stages of the series in countries where entry was possible without restrictive quarantine measures; the ISU Council agreed with the proposals. Russia received an additional two entries in singles and ice dance (no pairs events in France) at the third JGP event in Slovakia and at the fourth JGP event in Russia.

Issues 
During the fourth JGP event in Russia, the rhythm dance, the first event on the opening day, was suspended after one group due to technical issues; the event later resumed at 22:00 (original scheduled finish time of 16:21) after the remainder of the day's events were completed.

Competitions 
The locations of the JGP events change yearly. In the 2021–22 season, the series is composed of the following events in autumn 2021:

Entries 
Skaters who reach the age of 13 before July 1, 2021, but have not turned 19 (singles and females of the other two disciplines) or 21 (male pair skaters and ice dancers) are eligible to compete on the junior circuit. Competitors are chosen by their countries according to their federation's selection procedures. The number of entries allotted to each ISU member federation was to be determined by their skaters' placements at the 2021 World Junior Championships in each discipline, before the competition was cancelled. ISU member nations were required to confirm the number of allotted slots they intended to utilize by June 1, 2021.

Number of entries per discipline 
The number of entries each ISU member nation was allowed to field per discipline was to be based on the results of the 2021 World Junior Championships, before the competition was cancelled. The ISU instead used the 2020 World Junior Championships results.

Singles and ice dance

Pairs

Medal summary

Medalists

Men

Women

Pairs

Ice dance

Medal table

Qualification 
Due to the ongoing COVID-19 pandemic, the ISU chose not to implement JGP rankings for the 2021–22 season. On October 4, the ISU announced the alternative qualification procedure for the Junior Grand Prix Final in December. In addition to the below procedure, Japan, as the host of the Junior Grand Prix Final, was awarded a wild card berth in men's and women's singles.

 For singles and ice dance
 The seven winners of each individual JGP event will qualify for the Final.
 Should there only be six different individual winners out of the seven individual JGP events because a skater/team has won two JGP events, the six different individual winners will qualify for the Final.
 Should there be fewer than six different individual winners out of the seven individual JGP events because more skaters/teams have won two JGP events, all the different individual winners will qualify for the Final. In addition, the best second-placed skater/team, third-placed skater/team, and so forth by total score, who are not yet qualified as a winner, would be invited to the Final to reach the number of six entries.

 For pairs
 The four winners of each individual JGP event will qualify for the Final.
 Should there be fewer than four different individual winners out of the four individual JGP events because a pair has won two JGP events, all the different individual winners will qualify for the Final. In addition, the best second-placed pair, third-placed pair, and so forth by total score, who are not yet qualified as a winner, would be invited to the Final to reach the number of four entries.

 Alternates
The three best second-placed skaters/teams, third-placed skaters/teams, and so forth by total score, who are not yet qualified in accordance with the above, will be alternates for the Final. Substitution of skaters will only come into force if the minimum number of entries of six men (not counting the wild card), six women (not counting the wild card), four pairs, and six ice dance teams cannot be reached with the qualified skaters/teams.

Qualifiers

Records and achievements

Records 

The following new junior ISU best scores were set during this season:

Achievements 
  Hannah Lim / Ye Quan (bronze at JGP France I) are the first South Korean and the first Asian ice dance team to win an ISU Junior Grand Prix medal.
  Arlet Levandi (silver at JGP France II) won Estonia's first JGP medal in men's singles.
  Karina Safina / Luka Berulava (silver at JGP Slovakia) are the first Georgian pairs team to win an ISU Junior Grand Prix medal.
 In the women's free skating at JGP Slovakia,  Mia Kalin and  Veronika Zhilina became the seventh and eighth women, respectively, to land a fully rotated quadruple jump in international competition.
 In the women's short program at JGP Russia,  Sofia Akateva became the 13th woman to land a clean triple Axel in international competition. In the women's free skating,  Sofia Samodelkina,  Anastasia Zinina, and Akateva became the ninth, tenth, and 11th women, respectively, to land a fully rotated quadruple jump. Akateva also recorded the highest-ever TES for a junior woman in both programs, and set the junior record for the free skating and combined scores.
  Angelina Kudryavtseva / Ilia Karankevich (bronze at JGP Poland) won Cyprus's first ISU Grand Prix medal at either the junior or senior level in any discipline.
 In the women's free skating at JGP Poland,  Sofia Akateva became the first woman to land a triple Axel and three quadruple jumps in one program.
 In the women's free skating at JGP Austria,  Varvara Kisel became the 14th woman to land a clean triple Axel in international competition.

Top JGP scores

Men

Best total score

Best short program score

Best free skating score

Women

Best total score

Best short program score

Best free skating score

Pairs

Best total score

Best short program score

Best free skating score

Ice dance

Best total score

Best rhythm dance score

Best free dance score

Notes

References

External links 
 ISU Junior Grand Prix at the International Skating Union

ISU Junior Grand Prix
Junior Grand Prix
ISU Junior Grand Prix